The following musical events and releases are expected to happen in 2018 in Canada.

Events
 March – Juno Awards of 2018
 April – East Coast Music Awards
 May – Prism Prize
 June – Preliminary longlist for the 2018 Polaris Music Prize is announced
 July – SOCAN Songwriting Prize
 July – Shortlist for the Polaris Music Prize is announced
 September 17 – Jeremy Dutcher wins the Polaris Music Prize for his album Wolastoqiyik Lintuwakonawa
 December 1 – 14th Canadian Folk Music Awards

Albums released

A
AHI, In Our Time
Jann Arden, These Are the Days – February 2
Arkells, Rally Cry – October 19
Astral Swans, Strange Prison – May 30

B
Bahamas, Earthtones – January 19
Gord Bamford, Neon Smoke – January 19
Jill Barber, Metaphora – June 22
Matthew Barber, Phase of the Moon
Ridley Bent, Ridley Bent and the Killer Tumbleweeds
Beppie, Let's Go Bananas!
Bernice, Puff LP: in the air without a shape
Laila Biali, Laila Biali – January 26
Jean-Michel Blais, Dans ma main – May 11
Forest Blakk, Minutes
The Blue Stones, Black Holes (re-release) - October 26
Bob Moses, Battle Lines – September 14
Bonjay, Lush Life
Born Ruffians, Uncle, Duke & the Chief – February 16
Paul Brandt, The Journey YYC, Vol. 1 – April 6
Paul Brandt, The Journey BNA, Vol. 2 – November 9
Jim Bryson, Tired of Waiting – September 14

C
Cadence Weapon, Cadence Weapon – January 19
Alessia Cara, The Pains of Growing – November 30
Caracol, À paraitre – February 2
Jennifer Castle, Angels of Death – May 18
Chilly Gonzales, Solo Piano III – September 7
Chromeo, Head Over Heels – June 15
City and Colour, Guide Me Back Home – October 5
Classified, Tomorrow Could Be – June 29; Tomorrow Could Be The Day Things Change – October 12
Cœur de pirate, En cas de tempête, ce jardin sera fermé – June 8
Antoine Corriveau, Feu de forêt
Cowboy Junkies, All That Reckoning
Jim Cuddy, Constellation – January 26

D
Marie Davidson, Working Class Woman
Art d'Ecco, Trespasser
Dilly Dally, Heaven
The Dirty Nil, Master Volume – September 14
Drake, Scary Hours – January 19
Drake, Scorpion – June 29
Jeremy Dutcher, Wolastoqiyik Lintuwakonawa – April 6

E
Elisapie, The Ballad of the Runaway Girl

F
54-40, Keep on Walking
Christine Fellows, Roses on the Vine – November 16
Michael Feuerstack, Natural Weather
Dominique Fils-Aimé, Nameless
Jeremy Fisher Junior, Highway to Spell
Sue Foley, The Ice Queen – March 2
La Force, La Force
FouKi, Zay
FouKi, La Zayté
Angelique Francis, Kissed by the Blues
The Fretless, Live from the Art Farm
FRIGS, Basic Behaviour
Frontperson, Frontrunner
Fucked Up, Dose Your Dreams – October 5

G
The Good Lovelies, Shapeshifters – February 9
Grand Analog, Survival – January 26
Great Lake Swimmers, Side Effects – April 13; The Waves, the Wake – August 17
Greg Keelor, Last Winter – April 27

H
Harm & Ease, Black Market Gold
Hawk Nelson, Miracles – April 6
Hillsburn, The Wilder Beyond – February 2
Nate Husser, minus 23 (July); 6° (October)
Andrew Hyatt, Cain

I
Zaki Ibrahim, The Secret Life of Planets – January 31

J
Jazz Cartier, Fleurever – July 27
Just John x Dom Dias, Don (June); Don II (November)

K
Kae Sun, Whoever Comes Knocking – March 2
Kellarissa, Ocean Electro
Francois Klark, Love
Korea Town Acid, Mahogani Forest
Nicholas Krgovich, "Ouch"

L
Mélissa Laveaux, Radyo Siwèl – February 2
Salomé Leclerc, Les choses extérieures
Hubert Lenoir, Darlène – February
Loony, Part 1
Les Louanges, La nuit est une panthère
Lowell, Lone Wolf
The Lynnes, Heartbreak Song for the Radio

M
Magic!, Expectations – September 7
Dan Mangan, More or Less – November 2
Matiu, Petikat 
Kalle Mattson, Youth
Matt Mays, Twice Upon a Hell of a Time – October 19
Efrim Manuel Menuck, Pissing Stars – February 2
Shawn Mendes, Shawn Mendes – May 25
Dylan Menzie, As the Clock Rewinds
Metric, Art of Doubt – September 21
Milk & Bone, Deception Bay – February 2
Monowhales, Control Freak
Mother Mother, Dance and Cry – November 2

N
Nap Eyes, I'm Bad Now – March 9
Safia Nolin, Dans le noir – October
Northern Haze, Siqinnaarut
Justin Nozuka, Low Tide – February 16
Justin Nozuka, Run To Waters – May 18

O
OBUXUM, H.E.R.
The Olympic Symphonium, Beauty in the Tension – February 9
Steven Lee Olsen, Timing Is Everything – November 9
The Oot n' Oots, Electric Jellyfish Boogaloo
Ought, Room Inside the World – February 16
Our Lady Peace, Somethingness – February 23

P
Dorothea Paas, One for the Road
Pharis and Jason Romero, Sweet Old Religion
Scott-Pien Picard, Scott-Pien Picard
Postdata, Let's Be Wilderness
Preoccupations, New Material – March 23

Q
Queer Songbook Orchestra, Anthems & Icons

R
Billy Raffoul, 1975
Rare Americans, Rare Americans
Allan Rayman, Harry Hard-On
Lee Reed, The Steal City EP
The Reklaws, Feels Like That – August 31
Reuben and the Dark, Arms of a Dream – May 4
Jessie Reyez, Being Human in Public
Daniel Romano, Human Touch – January 4
Daniel Romano, Nerveless – January 4
Daniel Romano, Finally Free
Rum Ragged, The Hard Times
Rusty, Dogs of Canada

S
Jay Scøtt, EM0G0D
Jay Scøtt x Smitty Bacalley, Un chevreuil 
Joseph Shabason, Anne – November 16
Shad, A Short Story About a War – October 28
Dylan Sinclair, Red Like Crimson
The Slakadeliqs, Heavy Rockin' Steady – February 9
Sloan, 12 – April 6
Snotty Nose Rez Kids, Rez Bangers & Koolapops
So Loki, Planet Bando
Rae Spoon, 
Story Untold, Waves – February 2
Suuns, Felt – March 2

T
TEKE::TEKE, Jikaku
Three Days Grace, Outsider – March 9
Thus Owls, The Mountain That We Live Upon
Tokyo Police Club, TPC – October 5
The Trews, Civilianaires – September 14
Tri-Continental, Dust Dance

U
U.S. Girls, In a Poem Unlimited – February 16

V
Mathew V, The Fifth
Diyet van Lieshout, Diyet and the Love Soldiers
Various Artists, The Al Purdy Songbook
Vile Creature, Cast of Static and Smoke
Voivod, The Wake – September 21

W
Wax Mannequin, Have a New Name
The Weeknd, My Dear Melancholy, – March 30
Wild Rivers, Eighty-Eight
Donovan Woods, Both Ways – April 20

Y
Yamantaka // Sonic Titan, Dirt
Young Galaxy, Down Time – April 6
Yukon Blonde, Critical Hit – June 22

Deaths

January 25 – Tommy Banks, 81, jazz musician and politician
June 19 – Matthew Grimson, 50, singer-songwriter
October 20 – Jon McMurray, 34, rapper and freeskier
December 19 – Mike "Beard Guy" Taylor, 51, keyboardist for Walk off the Earth

References